The 1941 Cork Intermediate Hurling Championship was the 32nd staging of the Cork Intermediate Hurling Championship since its establishment by the Cork County Board in 1909.

Cloughduv won the championship following a 6-04 to 3-00 defeat of Buttevant in the final. This was their second championship title overall and their first title since 1911.

Results

Final

References

Cork Intermediate Hurling Championship
Cork Intermediate Hurling Championship